Hazing in the Republic of Korea Armed Forces refers to the widespread hazing and bullying carried out among military personnel, often to conscripts and junior members in South Korea. Hazing has been enforced and encouraged mainly under the pretext of establishing military discipline and hierarchy. Hazing has resulted in a large number of fragging, shooting spree and suicide cases, such cases of suicide are referred to as non-combat casualties by the military. 

Such hazing has ranged from physical violence to malicious harassment, sexual violence, verbal abuse, to other forms of abuse, with some even resulting in death. Other forms of hazing have also included being beaten with a heated object and being forced to eat bugs. Such hazing in the South Korean military has led to numerous major incidents, including a series of suicides and gun shootings.

History
The Republic of Korea Armed Forces originates from the Korean Liberation Army, formed in response to Japanese occupation and attempts at colonization during WWII. The Ministry of National Defense (South Korea) specifies the roots of its armed forces as the Korean Liberation Army, which organized to liberate Korea from Japanese colonial rule during WWII. However, in the process of establishing the Korean Army under the command of the U.S. military government after liberation from Japanese colonial rule, military generals from Manchukuo Imperial Army and Japanese Army were at the center of the Korean Army. As such, the Japanese military culture was forced onto Korean military culture; normalizing beating, other forms of physical abuse, a strict ranking culture and hierarchy system, and an emphasis on mental perseverance by enduring harsh behavior. The same culture and values has still remained as remnants of Japanese occupation of Korea.

In addition, the system of conscription in South Korea which requires male citizens between the ages of 18 and 28 to perform compulsory military service, a lack of transparency from the South Korean military, and a larger culture of hierarchal abuse continues to perpetuate hazing in the South Korean military.

Critics have also noted that LGBT South Korean soldiers are particularly targeted and vulnerable to hazing and extreme abuse during conscription.

Current situation
About 60 percent of the deaths in the South Korean military are suicides each year. According to the research, it has been confirmed that severe beatings, physical abuse, verbal abuse, and sexual violence have significant effects on the suicidal impulse of the respondent. 

The above data is an annual comparison of total deaths and suicides in the military from 1994 to 2019. 

While the true cause of such high suicide rates among South Korean military soldiers have been debated, research has shown that hazing, anger, depressive symptoms, and suicidal ideation were positively linked and that hazing is a significant predictor of high levels of anger and depressive symptoms. Others have also argued that rather than the isolation of conscription into the military, a culture of hierarchy in the military and senior soldiers abusing their power are the cause of high suicide rates among South Korean military soldiers.

Government actions
South Korea's Defense Ministry issued a decree in 2011 to root out hazing in the South Korean military. To ensure anonymous reporting, the agency also provides a service called Defense Help Call to receive reports of all possible crimes and violence that could lead to a suicide. The South Korean government also established a military human rights center to further ensure the human rights of South Korean military soldiers.

Recently, the South Korean government is preparing a policy to lower conscription standards for mental and physical conditions that would previously be considered exempt, as it fears that the nation's low birthrate will lead to fewer conscripts. South Korea in 2021 has the lowest fertility rate in the world, a title also bestowed on the country the previous year. However, experts warn such actions will eventually lead to even wider problems by recruiting personnel who would not be able to adapt to the closed military.

Hazing in popular culture
Since 80% of Korean men are conscripted soldiers and as hazing is common in South Korean culture, there have been many references and discussions in South Korean popular culture. Depictions of hazing and a larger culture of abuse and authority in the South Korean military have been presented through films, TV shows, animations, webtoons, and reality TV.

Notable incidents resulting from hazing
June 2005 - The 28th Infantry Division (Gyeonggi-do Yeoncheon). A 22-year-old South Korean private who had been hazed by his superiors killed eight soldiers early Sunday morning at a guard post at the demilitarized zone.
July 2011 – Second Marine Division shooting spree.
July 2013 – Suicide of Private Kim.
April 2014 - The 28th Infantry Division (Gyeonggi-do Yeoncheon). Private Yoon Seung-joo, 23, died in April after being beaten and denied food and sleep.
June 2014 – Gangwon-do Goseong shooting spree.
September 2015 – Suicide at GP.
22 July 2017 – Infantry Private Goh committed suicide by jumping.

See also
Hazing in the military
Conscription in South Korea
Republic of Korea Armed Forces
Dedovshchina
Ganghwa Island shooting
Human rights in South Korea

References

Bullying
Abuse
Human rights abuses in South Korea
Military of South Korea
Military scandals
Hazing
Violence against men in Asia